dolichyl-phosphate mannosyltransferase polypeptide 3, also known as DPM3, is a human gene.

Function 

Dolichol-phosphate mannose (Dol-P-Man) serves as a donor of mannosyl residues on the lumenal side of the endoplasmic reticulum (ER). Lack of Dol-P-Man results in defective surface expression of GPI-anchored proteins. Dol-P-Man is synthesized from GDP-mannose and dolichol-phosphate on the cytosolic side of the ER by the enzyme dolichyl-phosphate mannosyltransferase. The protein encoded by this gene is a subunit of dolichyl-phosphate mannosyltransferase and acts as a stabilizer subunit of the dolichyl-phosphate mannosyltransferase complex.

Clinical significance 

Mutations in this gene are associated with congenital disorder of glycosylation type 1O.

References

Further reading

External links
  GeneReviews/NCBI/NIH/UW entry on Congenital Disorders of Glycosylation Overview

EC 2.4.1